Rumble on the Rock (also known as K-1 Rumble on the Rock) was an American mixed martial arts (MMA) promotion company in promotion with K-1 and operated by Fighting and Entertainment Group and Rumble World Entertainment. Headquartered Hawaii, Rumble on the Rock was formed in 2002 and enforces the Unified Rules of Mixed Martial Arts with events structured around tournaments.

Rumble on the Rock has held over 30 events and presided nearly 300 matches highlighting some of the best international talent, establishing and enhancing the careers of top ranked fighters including Anderson Silva, B.J. Penn, Takanori Gomi, Jake Shields, Gilbert Melendez, Carlos Condit, Chael Sonnen, Rodrigo Gracie, Ricco Rodriguez, Yushin Okami, Frank Trigg, Royler Gracie, Dave Menne, Matt Lindland, Thales Leites, and more.

Rules 

Rumble on the Rock's rules are based upon the Unified Rules of Mixed Martial Arts that were originally established by the New Jersey State Athletic Control Board and modified by the Nevada State Athletic Commission. These rules have been adopted across the US in other states that regulate mixed martial arts. As a result, they have become the standard de facto set of rules for professional mixed martial arts across the US and for cage-based MMA worldwide.

All bouts are contested over three, five-minute rounds, with the exception of five-round championship bouts. There is a one-minute rest period in-between rounds. As per the Unified Rules of MMA, Rumble on the Rock only allows competitors to fight in approved shorts, without shoes or any other sort of foot padding. Fighters must use approved light gloves (4-6 ounces) that allow fingers to grab. The referee has the right to stop the fighters and stand them up if they reach a stalemate on the ground (where neither are in a dominant position nor working toward one) after a verbal warning.

Match outcome 
Matches usually end via:
Submission: a fighter taps on the mat or his opponent three times (or more) or verbally submits.
Knockout: a fighter falls from a legal blow and is either unconscious or unable to immediately continue.
Technical Knockout: stoppage of the fight by the referee if it is determined a fighter cannot "intelligently defend" himself or by ringside doctor due to injury.
Judges' Decision: Depending on scoring, a match may end as:
unanimous decision (all three judges score a win for one fighter),
split decision (two judges score a win for one fighter with the third for the other),
majority decision (two judges score a win for one fighter with one for a draw),
unanimous draw (all three judges score a draw),
majority draw (two judges score a draw).
split draw (the total points for each fighter is equal)

A fight can also end in a technical decision, technical draw, disqualification, forfeit or no contest.

Judging criteria 
The ten-point must system is used for all Rumble on the Rock bouts; three judges score each round and the winner of each receives ten points, the loser nine points or less. If the round is even, both fighters receive ten points. The decision is announced at the end of the match but the judge's scorecards are not announced.

Fouls 
The following are considered fouls in Rumble on the Rock:

 Butting with the head.
 Eye gouging of any kind.
 Biting.
 Hair pulling.
 Groin attacks of any kind.
 Fish hooking, gouging as in self-defense and some martial arts.
 Putting a finger into any orifice or into any cut or laceration on an opponent.
 Small joint manipulation.
 Striking to the spine or the back of the head. (see Rabbit punch)
 Striking downward using the point of the elbow. (see Elbow (strike))
 Throat strikes of any kind, including, without limitation, grabbing the trachea.
 Clawing, pinching or twisting the flesh.
 Grabbing the clavicle.
 Kicking the head of a grounded opponent.
 Kneeing the head of a grounded opponent.
 Stomping a grounded opponent.
 Kicking to the kidney with the heel.
 Spiking an opponent to the canvas on his head or neck. (see piledriver (professional wrestling))
 Throwing an opponent out of the ring or fenced area.
 Holding the shorts or gloves of an opponent.
 Spitting at an opponent.
 Engaging in an unsportsmanlike conduct that causes an injury to an opponent.
 Holding the ropes or the fence.
 Using abusive language in the ring or fenced area.
 Attacking an opponent on or during the break.
 Attacking an opponent who is under the care of the referee.
 Attacking an opponent after the bell has sounded the end of the period of unarmed combat.
 Flagrantly disregarding the instructions of the referee.
 Timidity, including, without limitation, avoiding contact with an opponent, intentionally or consistently dropping the mouthpiece or faking an injury.
 Interference by the corner.
 Throwing in the towel during competition.

When a foul is charged, the referee in their discretion may deduct one or more points as a penalty. If a foul incapacitates a fighter, then the match may end in a disqualification if the foul was intentional, or a no contest if unintentional. If a foul causes a fighter to be unable to continue later in the bout, it ends with a technical decision win to the injured fighter if the injured fighter is ahead on points, otherwise it is a technical draw.

Rumble on the Rock champions

Tournament champions

Rumble on the Rock Welterweight Tournament bracket

Events

References

External links 

Mixed martial arts organizations
Mixed martial arts events lists